The Internal Settlement was an agreement which was signed on 3 March 1978 between Prime Minister of Rhodesia Ian Smith and the moderate African nationalist leaders comprising Bishop Abel Muzorewa, Ndabaningi Sithole and Senator Chief Jeremiah Chirau. After almost 15 years of the Rhodesian Bush War, and under pressure from the sanctions placed on Rhodesia by the international community, and political pressure from South Africa, the United Kingdom, and the United States, the Rhodesian government met with some of the internally based moderate African nationalist leaders in order to reach an agreement on the political future for the country. 

The agreement led to the creation of an interim government in which Africans were included in leading positions for the first time. This in turn was to lead to the achievement of the settlement's main goal which was for the country to gain international recognition, which in turn implied that sanctions imposed on Rhodesia which came about as a result of the announcement of the Unilateral Declaration of Independence of 1965, would be abolished. 

Following the agreement, the general election of March 1979 was held which brought Muzorewa and his UANC party to power. The electorate was not qualified by race, but purely on meeting certain conditions, such as educational standard and/or income and/or worth of property owned enabling a majority of African Zimbabweans to vote for the first time. The election process was witnessed by international observers, who were in agreement that the process had, in the main, been free and fair.

Zimbabwe Rhodesia
A new government of national unity with Bishop Abel Muzorewa as Prime Minister took office on 1 June 1979.  The country was renamed Zimbabwe Rhodesia, and a new national flag was later adopted signifying the transition. It was expected that all sanctions would be lifted now that the country was under democratically elected black majority rule. However, the lifting of sanctions did not occur mainly because the Patriotic Front, composed of the externally based African nationalist parties of ZAPU and ZANU under the respective leadership of Joshua Nkomo and Robert Mugabe, had not been involved in the political process and had not participated in the general election. Under mounting international pressure, particularly from Jimmy Carter, Andrew Young and the British Government, Muzorewa was persuaded to take part in negotiations at Lancaster House late 1979.  

The agreement at the Lancaster House Conference between the Zimbabwe Rhodesia and British Governments, ZAPU and ZANU in December 1979 resulted in a ceasefire and the end of the Rhodesian Bush War.  The country returned to legality under direct British rule with Lord Soames as Governor, thereby ending the rebellion against the British Crown caused by the signing of Rhodesia's Unilateral Declaration of Independence in November 1965.  Under the terms of the Lancaster House Agreement, a fresh general election was held in February 1980 following which the country attained its independence as the Republic of Zimbabwe on 18 April 1980 with Robert Mugabe as its first Prime Minister.

Reaction
After the internal settlement was announced, the United Kingdom and the United States—in separate statements—said that they viewed the settlement as a step in the right direction, but nevertheless inadequate because ZANU and ZAPU were not included. Each of the Frontline States—Angola, Botswana, Mozambique, Tanzania, and Zambia—condemned the settlement as a "sell-out" and accused Muzorewa, Sithole, and Chirau of being complicit with the Rhodesian government, which they saw as illegal. The Patriotic Front, composed of ZANU and ZAPU, also condemned the settlement and similarly accused the three black signatories of being Rhodesian puppets. It vowed to continue fighting until attaining a military victory in the war. The Council of Ministers of the Organisation of African Unity had several days earlier—at its thirtieth ordinary session in Tripoli, Libya, from 20 to 28 February 1978—foreseen the prospect of a settlement, and issued a statement condemning any agreement that did not include the Patriotic Front. 

Prompted by the request of the African Group within the United Nations, the UN Security Council of discussed the issue of Rhodesia's internal settlement at its 2061st to 2067th meetings from 6–14 March 1978. Robert Mugabe and Joshuo Nkomo spoke before the council and condemned the settlement. On 14 March 1978, the Security Council adopted Resolution 423, which condemned the internal settlement as illegal and unacceptable. Canada, France, the US, the UK, and West Germany abstained from the vote.

Further reading
Catholic Institute for International Relations, Catholic Commission for Justice and Peace in Rhodesia. Rhodesia After the Internal Settlement, 1978.

References

1978 in Rhodesia
History of Zimbabwe
Politics of Rhodesia
Rhodesian Bush War
Treaties concluded in 1978
March 1978 events in Africa